Carbidopa/oxitriptan (developmental code name EVX-101), or carbidopa/5-hydroxytryptophan (carbidopa/5-HTP), is a combination of 5-hydroxytryptophan (oxitriptan), a serotonin precursor, and carbidopa, a peripherally selective aromatic L-amino acid decarboxylase inhibitor, which is under development as an antidepressant for the treatment of depressive disorders. As of June 2020, it is in phase 1 clinical trials for this indication.

References

Aromatic L-amino acid decarboxylase inhibitors
Antidepressants
Combination drugs
Experimental drugs
Prodrugs